Lone Tree Lake is a natural lake in South Dakota, in the United States.

Lone Tree Lake was named on account of there being a single tree which stood there.

See also
List of lakes in South Dakota

References

Lakes of South Dakota
Lakes of Deuel County, South Dakota